Paseo may refer to:

 a paseo, a promenade, esplanade or public avenue. 
 Paseo, a euphemism for a ride to summary execution during the White Terror during the Spanish Civil War

Parkways and malls
 The Paseo (Kansas City, Missouri), a parkway in Kansas City, Missouri, U.S.
 The Paseo (Pasadena), an outdoor mall in Pasadena, California, U.S.
 Paseo Arts District, a commercial shopping district in Oklahoma City, U.S.
 Paseo de la Reforma, wide avenue that runs diagonally across the heart of Mexico City
 Paseo de Roxas, prime commercial artery in the Makati Central Business District of Metro Manila

Entertainment
 Paseo (film), a 2018 Canadian short film
 "Paseo", a song by Paradisio from Paradisio

Other
 Toyota Paseo, a subcompact car
 Paseo (restaurant), a former restaurant in Seattle, Washington

See also
 
 El Paseo (disambiguation)